Napier is an extinct town in Holt County, in the U.S. state of Missouri. The GNIS classifies it as a populated place.

Napier was founded in 1882, and named for a railroad promoter. A post office called Napier was established in 1889, and remained in operation until 1943.

References

Ghost towns in Missouri
Former populated places in Holt County, Missouri